The Pangraptinae are a subfamily of moths in the family Erebidae.

Taxonomy
Phylogenetic analysis only weakly supports the subfamily as a clade but determines that the clade containing the Aganainae, Herminiinae (litter moths), and Arctiinae (tiger and lichen moths) is most closely related. The Pangraptinae may be significantly revised after further study.

Genera
Episparis
Gracilodes
Hyposemansis
Ledaea
Masca
Pangrapta

References

 
Moth subfamilies